Fritillaria sororum is a species of bulb-forming flowering plant in the lily family Liliaceae, found only in the Taurus Mountains of southern Turkey.

Some authorities consider this the same species as Fritillaria acmopetala.

References

sororum
Flora of Turkey
Plants described in 1998